Lynn D. (Pop) Sweet (October 22, 1881 – October 21, 1918) was a professional American football player who played with the Philadelphia Athletics in the first National Football League and for the 1903 US Football Champions, the Franklin Athletic Club. Sweet also won, with Franklin, the 1903 World Series of Football, held that December at Madison Square Garden.

Prior to his professional career, he played at the college level. For 3 seasons he played for the Bucknell Bison and then spent his last season of college football with the Penn State Nittany Lions. He died in 1918.

References

Franklin Athletic Club players
Philadelphia Athletics (NFL) players
Penn State Nittany Lions football players
Bucknell Bison football players
Canton Bulldogs (Ohio League) players
Canton Athletic Club players
1881 births
1918 deaths